Bagh Chaleh (also Romanized as Bāgh Chaleh and Bāghcheleh; also known as Baghjaleh, Bāgh Shāleh, Bōgh Shāleh, and Dāq Shāleh) is a village in Howmeh Rural District, in the Central District of Divandarreh County, Kurdistan Province, Iran. At the 2006 census, it had a population of 525, in 119 families. The village is populated by Kurds.

References 

Towns and villages in Divandarreh County
Kurdish settlements in Kurdistan Province